Colwin Cort (born 19 September 1967) is a Guyanese cricketer. He played in two List A and two first-class matches for Guyana from 1990 to 1994.

See also
 List of Guyanese representative cricketers

References

External links
 

1967 births
Living people
Guyanese cricketers
Guyana cricketers